The 2021 Primus Classic (also known as the Grand Prix Impanis-Van Petegem) was the 23rd edition of the Primus Classic road cycling one day race, which was held on 18 September 2021 as part of the 2021 UCI Europe Tour and the 2021 UCI ProSeries calendars. This edition was the race's first in the UCI ProSeries; the 2020 edition was expected to feature in the inaugural UCI ProSeries but was cancelled due to the COVID-19 pandemic.

The race's hilly route covered  from Brakel in East Flanders to Haacht in Flemish Brabant. Almost immediately from the start, riders took on the Tenbosse, the first of many short but steep hills. The last hill, the Hulstbergstraat, was crested with just under  to go, and from there, the conclusion of the race was net downhill to the finish line near Boortmeerbeek/Wespelaar in Haacht, just outside a Primus brewery.

A few kilometres later, further attacks reduced the group to just five riders; these were Tosh Van der Sande, Simon Clarke, Jasper Stuyven, and the  duo of Mikkel Frølich Honoré and Florian Sénéchal. Consecutive accelerations from both  riders dropped Clarke, who managed to catch back up in the final kilometre. However, just as he was doing so, Honoré led the group on the finishing straight and gradually increased the pace to lead out Sénéchal. Stuyven was the first to begin sprinting, but Sénéchal came out of his slipstream and sprinted past him before holding off Van der Sande for the win.

Teams 
11 of the 19 UCI WorldTeams, five UCI ProTeams, and four UCI Continental teams made up the twenty teams that participated in the race. In total, 133 riders started the race, of which 111 finished; however, two riders were disqualified and thus not counted, so there were officially 109 finishers.

UCI WorldTeams

 
 
 
 
 
 
 
 
 
 
 

UCI ProTeams

 
 
 
 
 

UCI Continental Teams

Result

References

Sources

External links 
 

Primus Classic
Primus Classic
Primus Classic
Primus Classic